Below is a list of the rosters for the 2016–17 WNBL season.

Rosters

Adelaide Lightning

Bendigo Spirit

Canberra Capitals

Dandenong Rangers

Melbourne Boomers

Perth Lynx

Sydney Uni Flames

Townsville Fire

References

2016–17 WNBL season
Women's National Basketball League lists